Redenção is a municipality in the state of Ceará, in the Northeast region of Brazil. located 55 km away from Fortaleza, the capital of the state. Redenção in Portuguese means redemption, and the city has this name because it was the first city in Brazil that abolished its slaves.

History

The region known as "sopés do Maciço de Baturité" around the Acarape River was inhabited for many different native Brazilians of different ethnicities like Potyguara, Jenipapo and Kanyndé. During the expansion of agricultural cultures in the state of Ceará, the region of Redenção started the production of sugarcane. During the 19th century, manyslaves were brought from Africa by Portuguese colonizers to work in the sugarcane production.

In 1868 the city of Acarape was founded. At that time, all the city of Redenção was inserted in the city of Acarape.

In 1882, the region of Acarape abolished all its slaves, that way it started being called Redenção. After that, the region became a city.

Geography

Redenção is located in a tropical semi-humid region, that way the weather varies from 22 °C to 32 °C. Redenção is located in an area with mountains with a great amount of rain every year. The vegetation in Redenção is called Caatinga. Redenção is currently divided in four districts called: Redenção, Antônio Diogo, Guassi and São Geraldo.

Education

Redenção hosts the University of International Integration of the Afro-Brazilian Lusophony (UNILAB) which is a public, federal university. Redenção also has three private high schools and three public high schools. It also hosts a State School of Professional Education.

Tourism

Redenção is a historic city which is visited by hundreds of tourists every year. The city has two museums, three main squares, and natural landscapes. In Redenção, there is the mountain of Saint Rita which overlooks the city, and also natural lakes and rivers.

See also
List of municipalities in Ceará
Universidade da Integração Internacional da Lusofonia Afro-Brasileira (UNILAB)
Fortaleza

References

Municipalities in Ceará